Mabel Wayne (born Mabel Wimpfheimer, July 16, 1890 – June 19, 1978) was an American songwriter, noted as "one of the first women composers to publish a hit song".  Her songs included "In a Little Spanish Town", "Ramona", and "It Happened in Monterey"

Biography
She was born in Brooklyn, New York as Mabel Wimpfheimer in 1890 (although she later preferred to use the dates 1899 and 1904), and studied piano in Switzerland and then at the New York School of Music.   

Wayne performed as a concert pianist and singer, and as a dancer in vaudeville.    In the 1920s and 1930s she collaborated with several lyricists including L. Wolfe Gilbert, Sam M. Lewis and Joe Young.    Wayne was particularly noted for her Spanish-American themed songs.  She wrote for movies including King of Jazz, and later for British films, including Dance Band (1935).  She also made recordings, singing and playing piano, in the 1930s.

After a short-lived marriage in the 1910s, Mabel Wayne married Nick Campbell, a music publisher based in New York, on March 15, 1948 in the Little Church of the West, located in Reno, Nevada.  Lanny Ross and his wife served as the best man and matron of honor.

Mabel Wayne was inducted to the Songwriters Hall of Fame in 1972. She died at Glen Cove, Long Island, in 1978 at the age of 87.

Selected works
1925 – "Don't Wake Me Up, Let Me Dream", lyrics by L. Wolfe Gilbert
1926 –  "In a Little Spanish Town", lyrics by Sam M. Lewis & Joe Young  
1928 – "Ramona", lyrics by L. Wolfe Gilbert.
1930 – "It Happened in Monterey", lyrics by Billy Rose for the film King of Jazz later recorded and popularized by Frank Sinatra in 1956. 
1934 – "Little Man You've Had a Busy Day", lyrics by Maurice Sigler and Al Hoffman.
1937 – "Why Don’t You Fall In Love With Me?", lyrics by Al Lewis
1941 – "I Understand", lyrics by Kim Gannon.

References

External links
 Mabel Wayne recordings at the Discography of American Historical Recordings.

1890 births
1978 deaths
Songwriters from New York (state)
20th-century American composers